Jossias Macamo is a former footballer from Mozambique. He was also a member of the CD Costa do Sol management team and an Under-14 coach after retiring.

Kaizer Chiefs

Handed the number 23 jersey when signing for Kaizer Chiefs, a number synonymous with Siyabonga Nomvethe until 2001, the attacker made his debut in the Vodacom Challenge, authoring three goals in his first three outings which was accentuated with five goals in five games. The Mozambican also forged a strike partnership with Lucky Maselesele, spearheading the Amakhosi into the semi-finals of the BP Top 8 with a goal versus Ria Stars. Known for his goal celebration of displaying written messages, Macamo considers his time at the Soweto-based club to be the highlight of his career. During his stint at the club, the left-footed player was also known for being good in the air.

International

While at Kaizer Chiefs, Macamo was called up to represent Mozambique at the 2002 COSAFA Cup. In 2003 he was also called up to play against Burkina Faso in a qualifier for the Africa Cup of Nations, the biennial international football competition.

Trophies

 Vodacom Challenge (1): 2001
 BP Top 8 (1): 2001
 Moçambola (1): 2007
 Mozambique Cup (1): 2007

References

1976 births
Living people
Mozambican footballers
Mozambican expatriate footballers
Mozambique international footballers
CD Matchedje de Maputo players
CD Costa do Sol players
Kaizer Chiefs F.C. players
Expatriate soccer players in South Africa
Mozambican expatriate sportspeople in South Africa
1998 African Cup of Nations players
Association football midfielders
Dynamos F.C. (South Africa) players